This is the list of war films produced in Estonia during the period of independence from 1918 to 1940 and from 1991 and beyond. The first Estonian war film was produced in 1927.

Chronicle list

1920s

1930s

1940s

1990s

2000s

2010s

Notes and references

External links
Estonian Film

Estonia
War films